The Miss Captivity Pageant was a Lithuanian television program produced by Arūnas Valinskas that aired in 2002, the program was a beauty contest held in the Panevezys Penal Labour Colony, the only all-female prison in Lithuania; it holds over a thousand inmates. The show began as a joke between producers, and was a rating hit. The winner of the contest was Kristina Paliulionytė.

References

Beauty pageants in Lithuania
2002 beauty pageants